Mohawk Sports Park, is a large park on the east mountain of Hamilton, Ontario, 1100 Mohawk Road East, also known as Commonwealth Park and Upper King's Forest Park.

Facilities

A number of sporting venues including:

 an 8 lane dedicated competition track and field facility
 7 baseball fields including Bernie Arbour Memorial Stadium
 Mohawk 4 Ice Centre, (4 rinks)

See also

 List of sports venues in Hamilton, Ontario

References

Parks in Hamilton, Ontario